Tristania is a monotypic genus of flowering plants native to New South Wales, Australia, closely related to Thaleropia. The genus had a number of species, but some have been reclassified as Lophostemon and Tristaniopsis. The sole species currently in the genus is Tristania neriifolia. It is known commonly as the water gum.

It is a small tree, with dense branching. The leaves are evergreen, opposite, simple, lanceolate, 5–9 cm long and 1 cm broad. The flowers are produced in dense clusters of 3–15 together; each flower is 1–1.5 cm diameter, with five small yellow petals and numerous conspicuous stamens.

References 

Myrtaceae
Flora of New South Wales
Myrtales of Australia